Contrahierbas, also called Yanarraju (possibly from Quechua yana black, rahu snow, ice, mountain with snow) or Ruricocha (possibly from Quechua ruri inside, Ancash Quechua ruri interior; inside; deep; valley or little river; qucha lake), is a mountain in the Cordillera Blanca in the Andes of Peru, about  high. It is situated in the Ancash Region in the provinces Asunción, Carhuaz and Yungay. Contrahierbas is located inside Huascarán National Park, northeast of Hualcán.

See also 
Quishuar (archaeological site)
Huacramarca
Yanarraju Lake

References

External links 

Mountains of Peru
Mountains of Ancash Region
Glaciers of Peru